Methoxmetamine (also known as 3-MeO-2'-Oxo-PCM, MXM and MMXE) is a dissociative anesthetic of the arylcyclohexylamine class that is closely related to methoxetamine and methoxyketamine, and has been sold online as a designer drug.

References

Arylcyclohexylamines
Designer drugs
Dissociative drugs
O-methylated phenols
Secondary amines